Assumption is a city in Christian County, Illinois, United States. The population was 1,155 as of the 2020 census.

History

Assumption originally was called "Tacusah". The present name is after Assumption Parish, Louisiana. A post office called Assumption has been operation since 1858. Assumption lays claim to the deepest coal mine (abandoned in the 1930s) in the state at over 1000' below the surface. First National Bank of Assumption (founded in 1900) claims to be the oldest bank in Christian County as it was the only bank in the county to remain open during the Great Depression. 

In  May 2017, news reached Assumption of the recovery of the remains of United States Air Force Captain Joseph S. Smith, a pilot shot down over Cambodia in 1971 during the Vietnam War. A large portion of the community turned out for his repatriation and internment in July, 2017

Geography

Demographics

As of the census of 2020, there were 1,155 people, 551 households, and 353 families residing in the city. The racial makeup of the city was 99.84% White, 0.08% Asian, and 0.08% from two or more races. Hispanic or Latino of any race were 0.16% of the population.

There were 551 households, out of which 28.7% had children under the age of 18 living with them, 51.4% were married couples living together, 8.9% had a female householder with no husband present, and 35.8% were non-families. 33.2% of all households were made up of individuals, and 18.9% had someone living alone who was 65 years of age or older. The average household size was 2.29 and the average family size was 2.86.

In the town the population was spread out, with 25.6% under the age of 18, 7.0% from 18 to 24, 27.0% from 25 to 44, 21.1% from 45 to 64, and 19.3% who were 65 years of age or older. The median age was 38 years. For every 100 females, there were 82.8 males. For every 100 females age 18 and over, there were 81.4 males.

The median income for a household in the town was $34,474, and the median income for a family was $41,417. Males had a median income of $35,650 versus $17,292 for females. The per capita income for the city was $16,421.  About 5.2% of families and 9.5% of the population were below the poverty line, including 11.6% of those under age 18 and 11.7% of those age 65 or over.

Education
Until 1992, Assumption was served by the Assumption School District #9.  Since 1992, Assumption has been served by the Central A&M School District, which also includes the village of Moweaqua, as well as the nearby rural areas.  Central A&M Middle School (grades 6-8) and Bond Elementary School (preK-2) are located in Assumption, as well as the school district office.

Enrollment at the middle school is approximately 170 students.

Assumption is also home to Kemmerer Village, a private Presbyterian childcare agency, named for donor Philip Kemmerer who willed  to "the orphans and friendless poor of all denominations" in 1884. Originally known as Kemmerer Orphan Home, the facility opened in 1914. In 1930, the named was changed to Kemmerer Children's Home.  Eventually the name became Kemmerer Village.

Notable people

 Lloyd Burdick,  football player
 James T. Carroll, Los Angeles City Council member, 1933, born in Assumption
 John Dudra, MLB infielder for the Boston Braves, was born in Assumption in 1916
 Brant Hansen, radio personality, graduated from Assumption High School, 1987

References

External links
 "Illinois Coal: The Legacy of an Industrial Society", sponsored by the Illinois State Historical Society includes an interview with Augustine Gobel, born in Assumption on April 21, 1909, who entered the coal mines at age sixteen.

Cities in Christian County, Illinois
Cities in Illinois
1902 establishments in Illinois
Populated places established in 1856